Vyartsilya is an urban locality (an urban-type settlement) under the administrative jurisdiction of the town of republic significance of Sortavala in the Republic of Karelia, Russia, located near the border with Finland,  west of Petrozavodsk, the capital of the republic. As of the 2010 Census, its population was 3,080.

History
Before World War II, Vyartsilya was part of the Finnish Värtsilä.

Urban-type settlement status was granted to it in 1946.

Administrative and municipal status
Within the framework of administrative divisions, the urban-type settlement of Vyartsilya is subordinated to the town of republic significance of Sortavala. As a municipal division, Vyartsilya is incorporated within Sortavalsky Municipal District as Vyartsilskoye Urban Settlement.

Border crossing
Vyartsilya is a major border checkpoint on the Finnish–Russian border (to Niirala in Tohmajärvi), with about one million people crossing the border annually. It is said that during the Cold War, from time to time, exchanges of captured spies occurred there.

Tourism
An international tourist route, Blue Highway, goes through Vyartsilya. The Blue Highway goes through four countries from Mo i Rana, Norway, via Sweden and Finland to Pudozh in Russia.

Notable people
 Ales Bialiatski (born 1962), Belarusian human rights activist, 2022 Nobel Peace Prize co-laureate

References

Notes

Sources

Urban-type settlements in the Republic of Karelia
Populated places established in the 1490s
Sortavala